Kij may refer to:

Kij, Lublin Voivodeship, a Polish village
Niigata Airport, in Niigata, Japan by IATA code
Kilivila language, an Austronesian language by ISO 639-3 code

People with the name
Kij Johnson (born 1960), American author